Roy Barker (born February 24, 1969) is a former professional American football defensive end. He played in the National Football League (NFL) for nine seasons for the Minnesota Vikings, San Francisco 49ers, Cleveland Browns, and Green Bay Packers. Barker played on the Central Islip, New York football Team in high school.

References

1969 births
Living people
Players of American football from New York City
American football defensive ends
Minnesota Vikings players
San Francisco 49ers players
Cleveland Browns players
Green Bay Packers players
North Carolina Tar Heels football players
People from Central Islip, New York
Sportspeople from Suffolk County, New York